The 2020–21 Telenet UCI Cyclo-cross World Cup was a season long cyclo-cross competition, organised by the Union Cycliste Internationale (UCI). The UCI Cyclo-cross World Cup took place between 4 October 2020 and 24 January 2021. In 2020, the UCI redesigned the UCI Cyclo-cross World Cup, expanding the total number of races to 14 (initially aiming for 16). The defending champions were Toon Aerts in the men's competition and Annemarie Worst in the women's competition.

Points distribution
Points were awarded to all eligible riders at each race. From this season, the points awarded are according to the same scale for all categories, but only the top 25 riders receive points rather than the top 50. The top ten finishers received points according to the following table:

 Riders finishing in positions 11 to 25 also received points, going down from 15 points for 11th place by one point per place to 1 point for 25th place.
 Note that the points given here are entirely different from the UCI ranking points, which are distributed according to a different scale and determine starting order in races, but have no impact on World Cup standings.

Events
In comparison to last season, intention was to expand the season from nine to fourteen races. The calendar included new races in Antwerp, Besançon, Diegem, Dublin, Hulst, Overijse, Villars, Dendermonde and Zonhoven, while the races in Bern, Heusden-Zolder, Iowa and Nommay were dropped.

Due to the COVID-19 pandemic however, the races in Besançon, Diegem, Dublin, Hoogerheide, Duinencross Koksijde, Villars, Waterloo and Zonhoven were cancelled and the cross in Antwerp was dropped from the World Cup and instead integrated into the X²O Badkamers Trophy. As a result, only five races remained.

Final points standings

Elite men

Elite women

Notes

References

Sources

External links

World Cup
World Cup
UCI Cyclo-cross World Cup